Fanzz is a sports apparel and team gear retailer based in Salt Lake City, Utah. Fanzz began operations in 1985. Fanzz/Just Sports currently has approximately 85 retail store locations in many US states. Fanzz purchased the Northwest-based Just Sports retailer on October 1, 2013. The company’s assets were sold in 2018 by the Larry H. Miller Company to Ames Watson Capital and re-incorporated as Fanzz Gear Inc.

References

External links
 

Clothing retailers of the United States
American companies established in 1985
Clothing companies established in 1985
Retail companies established in 1985
Companies based in Salt Lake City
1985 establishments in Utah

it:Fanzz.com